The PFL 9 mixed martial arts event for the 2018 season of the Professional Fighters League was held on October 13, 2018, at the Long Beach Arena in Long Beach, California.

Background
The event was the ninth of the 2018 season and marked the start of the playoffs for the Light Heavyweight and Lightweight divisions.

Results

2018 PFL Light Heavyweight playoffs

2018 PFL Lightweight playoffs

See also
List of PFL events
List of current PFL fighters

References

Professional Fighters League
2018 in mixed martial arts
Mixed martial arts in California
2018 in sports in California
October 2018 sports events in the United States
Events in Long Beach, California